Slightly Tempted is a 1940 American comedy film directed by Lew Landers and written by Arthur T. Horman. The film stars Hugh Herbert, Peggy Moran, Johnny Downs, Elisabeth Risdon, George E. Stone and Gertrude Michael. The film was released on October 18, 1940, by Universal Pictures.

Plot

Cast        
Hugh Herbert as Professor Ross
Peggy Moran as Judy Ross
Johnny Downs as Jimmy Duncan
Elisabeth Risdon as Ethelreda Knox
George E. Stone as Petey
Gertrude Michael as Duchess
Robert Emmett Keane as Gentleman Jack
Harry C. Bradley as Cartwright
Harry Holman as Mayor Ammerson
Walter Soderling as Findiggle
William Newell as Warcross

References

External links
 

1940 films
American comedy films
1940 comedy films
Universal Pictures films
Films directed by Lew Landers
American black-and-white films
1940s English-language films
1940s American films